Caius Boat Club (CBC; Caius pronounced keys) is the boat club for members of Gonville and Caius College, Cambridge.
The club has rowed on the River Cam since 1827, and like the other college boat clubs its aim is to gain and hold the headship of the Lent Bumps and May Bumps, now held in eight-oared boats, separately for men and women.

The club had a golden era from 1998 to 2007, finding itself in the top echelons of college rowing on both the men's and women's sides. From the May Bumps 1998 until the May Bumps 2007 Caius took 19 headships, 15 of these by the men. In 2000 they became the first college to take a double headship on both the men's and women's side in the May Bumps. In the 2019 Lent Bumps, CBC regained men's headship, after having lost it in 2017.

History

From its inception in 1827 as "Caius Wherry Club" the club has been active on the river, and became properly established by the construction of its own boat house. The Club saw some prominence in its early years, holding the headship in 1840, 1841 and 1844 (when only a singular bumps order existed, and there were no women at the university), but this was followed by a long drought. In 1987 The Men regained the Mays Headship but lost it the following year.

Recent times
During the golden era from 1998 to 2007, Caius took 5 consecutive Lent Headships (19 days at the top) and so claim to have earned the right to erect a clock tower on their boathouse, a popular myth on the River Cam, that may be made reality when the plans for the college's new boathouse are approved.

After another brief period in the doldrums, the Men's crew of 2010/2011 achieved the unlikely feat of remaining unbeaten on the river Cam in eights for an entire year. This run saw them bump up 4 times to the headship of the Lent Bumps (the first time this had been achieved in either bumps since 1962, and in the Lents since before WW2) and up 2 times to the headship of the May Bumps. They also represented the Cambridge Colleges against Christ Church, Oxford in a collegiate varsity race at the Henley Boat Races, becoming the only Cambridge men's crew to be successful against their dark blue opponents that year. The men's crew continue to be successful, retaining both the Lents and Mays Headship in 2012 and maintained their winning streak in side by side racing by beating Pembroke College, Oxford at the Henley Boat Races.

During the May bumps of 1998, the top 3 men's crews and the top 3 women's crews all secured the awarding of Blades by bumping up on each of the 4 days with the men's 1st VIII finishing Head of the River.  This 'clean sweep' of the top 6 boats being awarded their "Blades" has not happened previously, or since.

The men's first boat lost the Mays headship in 2016 to Maggie, and the Lents in 2017, also to Maggie. The women's first boat is currently second in Mays and thirteenth in Lents.

Caius Boat Club has a strong tradition of encouraging its athletes to trial for the university boat club CUBC (and formerly CULRC and CUWBC). In 2014 there were Caians in both the men and women's Blue Boat, Goldie, the CUWBC Lightweight boat and the men's lightweight spare pair.

Notable alumni

 Josh West, Olympic silver medalist
 Alison Mowbray, Olympic silver medalist
 Melissa Wilson, Current GB rower
 Matt Francis, Current CUBC rower

Alumni club
There exists a club for members who have left the college called Gonville Boat Club. Although GBC is primarily a recreational club, it occasionally enters regattas and sometimes races the current CBC 1st men's VIII. In 2008 a GBC crew took to the water with a total of 28 Cambridge headships between them.

Honours

Henley Royal Regatta

References

External links

 CUCBC at Cambridge University Combined Boat Club
 Caius Boat Club

Rowing clubs of the University of Cambridge
Organisations of Gonville and Caius College, Cambridge
Sports clubs established in the 1820s
1827 establishments in England
Rowing clubs in Cambridgeshire
Rowing clubs in England
Rowing clubs of the River Cam